"Down" is a song by American singer Mya, released as a single in 2019 from her eighth studio album T.K.O. (The Knock Out).

Music video
The music video for the song was directed by Josh Sikkema. A four-day shoot, the video was filmed in early January 2019 in Belitung and Sumatra. The video premiered on April 20, 2019 via Vevo and made available for purchase the next day.

Following the release of "With You", the pulsating "Down" was chosen as the next single to receive the visual treatment. Directed by Josh Sikkema, the song finds Mýa singing the importance of love's devotion in scenic views of Indonesia. While the video is shot in the South Pacific, its chorus has a Caribbean feel.

Release
To commemorate the one year arrival of her thirteenth studio project, T.K.O. (The Knock Out) as well as the twenty-first anniversary of her debut album Mýa (1998), Harrison surprised fans with a new music video. In preparation of the visual's release, Mýa uploaded several teasers over next few days on her official Instagram account. Before its release, Harrison reflected on the monumental occasion in an Instagram caption and commented, "Wouldn't have made it this far without you. Enjoy the art & goddess spring vibes from me & my amazing independent team. Love you all." The music video for "Down"  officially premiered 3 p.m. EST and 12 p.m. PST via Vevo. Following the video's release on Vevo, "Down" was made available for purchase on iTunes April 21, 2019.

Credits
Credits adapted from Instagram.

Video credits
 Josh Sikkema – direction
 Mýa – producer, creative direction, editing
 Derek Brown – creative direction, choreography
 Josh Sikkema – editing
 Derek Brown – choreography
 Sharon Sanchez & Shannon Ashlia – dancers
 Oth' Than Burnside – styling   
 Victoria Atelier – make-up and hair

Song credits
 Mýa – vocals, songwriter, engineering
 Sydnii Raymore and Shaunise Harris – songwriters
 MyGuyMars – producer
 Derek Anderson – mixing
 Malcolm Tariq Smith – mastering

Release history

References

External links
 

2018 songs
2019 singles
Mýa songs
Songs written by Mýa